The , officially the , is a Japanese aerial lift line in Fujikawaguchiko, Yamanashi, operated by Fuji Kyuko. Opened in 1959, the line climbs Mount Tenjō from the shores of Lake Kawaguchi, one of the Fuji Five Lakes. The line name comes from Kachi-kachi Yama (lit. "Mt. Kachikachi"), a folktale which took place on the mountain. The observatory has a view of the lake, as well as Aokigahara forest, and Mount Fuji.

Basic data
System: Aerial tramway, 3 cables
Cable length: 
Vertical interval: 
Maximum gradient: 34°07′
Operational speed: 3.4 m/s
Passenger capacity per a cabin: 36
Cabins: 2
Stations: 2
Duration of one-way trip: 3 minutes

See also
 Fujikyuko Line
 List of aerial lifts in Japan

External links
 Official website 

Aerial tramways in Japan
Tourist attractions in Yamanashi Prefecture
Transport in Yamanashi Prefecture
1959 establishments in Japan